Magic Circle Festival is an annual heavy metal festival organized by Magic Circle Music and founded by Joey DeMaio of the band Manowar. The festival was first held on 6 and 7 July 2007 in Bad Arolsen, Germany. The success of the 2007 festival, headlined by Manowar and attended by 25,000 people, led to an expanded festival in 2008, held over four days from 9 to 12 July. The lineup for the 2008 festival comprised a number of international acts, including Alice Cooper, Whitesnake, W.A.S.P. and Def Leppard. However, organisational and contractual difficulties led to the cancellation of Whitesnake and Def Leppard. In 2009, the festival was scaled back to two days and held in Lorelei on 18 and 19 July. The fourth Magic Circle Festival took place in Metalcamp in Slovenia at 11 July 2010, and on 25 July 2014 the fifth and currently latest Magic Circle Festival was held in Helsinki.

Lineups

2007 
 Black Situation
 David Shankle Group
 Gamma Ray
 Heavenly
 HolyHell
 Imperia
 Lion's Share
 Manowar
 Messiah's Kiss
 Mob Rules
 Mordeen
 Saidian
 Sixth Sense
 Stormwarrior

2008 
 Alice Cooper
 Beloved Enemy
 Benedictum
 Brazen Abbot (with Joe Lynn Turner)
 Cassock (winner of the Battle of the bands contest)
 Def Leppard (canceled due to "contractual difficulties")
 Doro
 Gotthard
 HolyHell
 Jack Starr's Burning Starr
 KOBUS!
 Krypteria
 Majesty/Metal Force
 Manowar
 Michael Schenker Group
 Mob Rules
 Sixth Sense
 Stormwarrior
 Ted Nugent
 Titanium Black
 W.A.S.P.
 Whitesnake (canceled due to "contractual difficulties")

2009 
 Age of Evil
 Crystal Viper
 Domain
 Heatseeker (side stage)
 HolyHell
 Jack Starr's Burning Starr
 Kingdom Come
 Manowar
 Metal Force
 Ulytau
 Van Canto
 Wizard

2010 
Arch Enemy
Crosswind
HolyHell
Kamelot
Manowar
Metalforce
Virgin Steele
Who Was I
Sabaton

2014 
Hostile
Imperia (with Netta Dahlberg on lead vocals)
Manowar
Teräsbetoni

DVD
A 2 disc DVD package of the 2007 event was released in October 2007. It was produced by Manowar bassist Joey DeMaio and directed by  Neil Johnson.

The DVD was also included as a free gift for a limited time to anyone who bought tickets for Magic Circle Festival 2008.

A DVD covering the 2008 festival was released in September 2008.

References

 Magic Circle Music news
 Magic Circle Festival news 
 Hungarian Unofficial site of The Magic Circle Festival

Music festivals established in 2007
Heavy metal festivals in Germany
Rock festivals in Slovenia
Rock festivals in Finland